Lykovrysi-Pefki is a municipality in the North Athens regional unit, Attica, Greece. The seat of the municipality is the town of Pefki.

Municipality
The municipality Lykovrysi-Pefki was formed at the 2011 local government reform by the merger of the following 2 former municipalities, that became municipal units:
Lykovrysi
Pefki

The municipality has an area of 4.126 km2.

References

Municipalities of Attica
Populated places in North Athens (regional unit)